Bithari Chainpur Assembly constituency is one of the 403 constituencies of the Uttar Pradesh Legislative Assembly, India. It is a part of the Bareilly district and one of the five assembly constituencies in the Aonla Lok Sabha constituency. First election in this assembly constituency was held in 2012 after the "Delimitation of Parliamentary and Assembly Constituencies Order, 2008" was passed and the constituency was formed in 2008. The constituency is assigned identification number 123.

Wards  / Areas
Extent of Bithari Chainpur Assembly constituency is KC Kiyara, Bithari Chainpur, Thiriya Nizabat Khan NP & Kargaina (CT) of Bareilly Tehsil; KCs Bisharatganj, Ballia & Bisharat-ganj NP of Aonla Tehsil.

Members of the Legislative Assembly

Election results

2022

2012
16th Vidhan Sabha: 2012 General  Elections

See also
Aonla Lok Sabha constituency
Bareilly district
Sixteenth Legislative Assembly of Uttar Pradesh
Uttar Pradesh Legislative Assembly
Vidhan Bhawan

References

External links
 

Assembly constituencies of Uttar Pradesh
Politics of Bareilly district
Constituencies established in 2008